Elizabeth Haran (born 1954) is an Australian novelist whose books were published in German and other European languages before being published in English. In the Valley of the Flaming Sun, published in 2007, spent eleven weeks on the German magazine Der Spiegel best seller list.

Life
Haran was born in 1954 in Bulawayo, Zimbabwe (then Rhodesia), and migrated to Australia as a child. She began writing in her thirties, after the birth of her second son.

Haran lives in Largs Bay, South Australia with her family.

Writing
Haran writes historical fiction, setting her novels in various parts of Australia in earlier centuries.

After being rejected by publishers in the UK and US, Haran's first novel was accepted by a German publisher in 1999, and appeared in 2001. She has written seventeen novels, all adventure/love stories set in Australia in the 19th and 20th centuries. She travels to the settings of her books to get a feel for the area and to do research. Her books have been published in more than ten countries (Germany, Bulgaria, France, Spain, Serbia, Russia, Croatia, Czech Republic, Slovakia, Poland, English speaking countries as e-books and Latvia), and have sold more than 1.5 million copies in Germany.  Her novels are very popular in Germany.

Works

Sunset over Eden
This book is set in the Queensland sugar cane town of Innisfail. The town is just recovering after being devastated in a cyclone. This book was published in German, Slovakian, Croatian, Czech and Russian.

Stars in the Southern Sky
This book is historical fiction set in Birdsville, Queensland, one of the most isolated towns in Australia. Elizabeth changed the name of the town to Kangaroo Crossing for the book. Foreign language editions of the book have been published in German, Czechoslovakian and Russian.

River of Fortune
This book was published in German, Czechoslovakian and Russian.

Whispers in the Wind
This book is set on Kangaroo Island, off the coast of South Australia, in 1845. This book was published in German, Czechoslovakian and Russian.

Dance of the Fiery Blue Gums
Dance of the Fiery Blue Gums, is set in the Clare Valley in 1866.

The Tantanoola Tiger
The Tantanoola Tiger is set in southeast South Australia in 1900.

The Heart of a Sunburned Land 
Heart of a Sunburned Land is set in northern South Australia in the 1920s.

A Faraway Place in the Sun 
A Faraway Place in the Sun is set in Port Adelaide and the Flinders Ranges in 1946.

References

External links
 Elizabeth Haran author website (archived)
 German publisher: Bastei Lübbe Verlag
 French editorial: Editions Archipel
 Book trailer https://www.youtube.com/watch?v=KHJSO0eH2eQ

1954 births
Living people
Australian women novelists
Zimbabwean emigrants to Australia
21st-century Australian novelists